Henry Margenson was a U.S. soccer defender who earned one cap with the U.S. national team in a 7-2 loss to Mexico on September 12, 1937. He spent at least two seasons with the Pawtucket Rangers of the American Soccer League.

References

United States men's international soccer players
American Soccer League (1921–1933) players
Possibly living people
Association football defenders
American soccer players
Year of birth missing
Pawtucket Rangers players